Fortson is a suburban community located in northern Muscogee County, Georgia, United States, with portions of the community extending into southern Harris County. The portion of the community in Muscogee County is in the city of Columbus.

Location

The community is located along the Harris-Muscogee County line north of the Bradley Park Drive area, and is generally bounded by Biggers Rd and Williams Rd to the south, the Alabama state line to the west, Mountain Hill Rd to the north in Harris County, and U.S. Route 27 to the east. Many upscale homes and neighborhoods are in this area, mainly off of Fortson, Wooldridge, and Whitesville Rds.

Education
The community is home to one of the seven schools served by the Harris County School District:

Elementary school 
 New Mountain Hill Elementary School

In popular culture

The community was used as a filming location for the MSNBC reality television series To Catch a Predator.

References

Unincorporated communities in Harris County, Georgia
Unincorporated communities in Georgia (U.S. state)
Muscogee County, Georgia